Bonagota piosana is a species of moth of the family Tortricidae which is endemic to Venezuela.

The ground colour of the forewings is cream, tinged pale yellowish brown, darker in the distal half, strigulated and partly suffused with brownish. The hindwings are cream, but whiter at the base and more brownish yellow on the periphery.

Etymology
The species name refers to the type-locality, Quebrada de los Píos.

References

External links

Moths described in 2006
Endemic fauna of Venezuela
Tortricidae of South America
Euliini
Taxa named by Józef Razowski